East Timor competes at the Olympics under its official name, Democratic Republic of Timor-Leste, since 2004, with its National Olympic Committee established in 2003. From 1976 until 1996, it competed as part of Indonesia and in 2000 competed as part of the Individual Olympic Athletes team. East Timor has yet to win its first medal.

Medal tables

Medals by Summer Games

Medals by Winter Games

See also
 List of flag bearers for East Timor at the Olympics
 East Timor at the Paralympics
 Tropical nations at the Winter Olympics

External links
 
 
 

 
Olympics